The Knowledge Park II is the metro station of the Noida Metro railway in Knowledge Park II, Greater Noida, Uttar Pradesh, India. It was opened on 25 January 2019.

The station
The station is located near the Knowledge Park II. It serves students from Sharda University,KCC Institute of Legal & Higher Education affiliated to GGSIP University New Delhi, Galgotias College of Engineering and Technology, Skyline Institute of Engineering and Technology, Birla Institute of Management Technology and Mangalmay Institute of Engineering & Technology. The metro station have a lot of food point to have auto stand down the metro station where you can auto for any college of towards surajpur or dadri

References

External links

Noida Metro stations
Railway stations in Gautam Buddh Nagar district
Transport in Noida